IBM Developer is a global community of coders, developer advocates, and digital resources that help developers learn, build, and connect. The IBM Developer website (previously known as IBM developerWorks) hosts a wide range of resources, tools, and subject matter expert conversations that help developers build and reinforce the open source, artificial intelligence AI, and cloud-based skills that are needed in hybrid cloud environments.

Overview 
With technical articles and tutorials, step-by-step learning paths, instructional videos, open source code samples, and online conferences, IBM Developer provides in-depth technical content focused on:

 Technologies such as artificial intelligence, containers, and more
 Programming languages like Java and Node.js
 Development practices like DevOps and mulitcloud development
 Architecture and deployment models including microservices

Online conferences allow users to interact with developer advocates during livestream events, or watch post-event replays on demand.

IBM Developer is also a primary supporter of the Call For Code program, which enlists developers and problem solvers worldwide to build and contribute to sustainable, open source technology projects that address current social and humanitarian issues. These projects can include everything from protecting the health of firefighters battling wildfires to helping farmers make more efficient use of water.

In addition, IBM Developer works with IBM partners and independent software vendors (ISVs) to create technical content that meets their specific needs.

References

External links
 IBM Developer

DeveloperWorks
DeveloperWorks
Software developer communities